Little Mix The Search is a British reality television music competition that was announced in October 2019, and began airing on BBC One on 26 September 2020, concluding with the final on 7 November 2020. The series was judged by British girl group Little Mix, with the winning act from the series joining them on The Confetti Tour (2022). In August 2021 it was announced that the show had been put on an "indefinite hold" after one series.

History
The premise for Little Mix The Search was announced in October 2019, when applications for the show were opened. The premise of The Search was for British girl group Little Mix to find singers to form a new group. It was confirmed that the members of Little Mix, Leigh-Anne Pinnock, Jade Thirlwall, Perrie Edwards and Jesy Nelson, would act as judges. Applications closed on 10 January 2020, and filming commenced later that month. In March 2020, it was announced that comedian Chris Ramsey would be presenting The Search.

The auditions and group formation episodes had been filmed and were set to air on BBC One in April 2020 with the live shows following shortly afterwards. However, due to the COVID-19 pandemic, their Summer 2020 Tour was cancelled and the series was postponed while the production team debated how to proceed under lockdown guidelines. When asked about the effect of the pandemic on The Search, Edwards said: "The live shows bit is coming, obviously we don’t know when but everything else before the live shows we’ve already filmed. So everything’s good to go, we’re basically just waiting for lockdown." On 20 July 2020, it was announced that the series would premiere later in the year, later confirmed to be on 26 September 2020, beginning with the pre-filmed auditions and group formation episodes, before commencing the live shows under social distancing guidelines. The groups competed for a chance to support Little Mix on their Confetti Tour in 2022.

On 14 October 2020, it was announced via Twitter that the first live episode, originally set for broadcast on 17 October, had been postponed to 24 October due to several members of the production crew having been tested positive for COVID-19 and entering self-isolation. The showrunners and producers confirmed that none of the members of Little Mix tested positive for the virus. On 21 October, it was announced that Thirlwall, who had decided to self-isolate at home as a precaution, would appear during the first live episode solely via video link. On 24 October, Little Mix performed "Sweet Melody" as part of the "Battle of the Bands" episode, a performance that Thirlwall was absent for. On 31 October, the semi-final was postponed to 6 November in favour of a BBC news special, with the final following it on 7 November. On 7 November, it was announced that Nelson would be unable to appear during the final due to an illness.

On 26 August 2021 it was announced that the show would not be returning for a second series and had been put on an "indefinite hold", with the head of BBC Entertainment citing Edwards' and Pinnock's pregnancies as a factor.

Episodes

Live performances
Colour key
 Indicates that the group was in the bottom two and had to perform again in the sing off
 Indicates that the group was eliminated
 Indicates that the group won the competition

"Battle of the Bands" (24 October 2020)
Special Performances:
 Little Mix – "Sweet Melody"
 Jax Jones and Au/Ra - "I Miss U"

Little Mix's votes to send through to the semi-final
 Thirlwall: Melladaze
 Pinnock: Melladaze
 Edwards: Melladaze
 Nelson was not required to vote as there was already a majority, but confirmed she would have voted to send through Melladaze.

"Semi-Final" (6 November 2020)
Special Performances:
 Little Mix – "Holiday"/"Touch"
 McFly – "Tonight is the Night"

Little Mix's votes to send through to the final
 Pinnock: New Priority
 Thirlwall: Since September
 Nelson: New Priority
 Edwards: Since September 

With the acts in the bottom two receiving two votes each, the girls had to deliberate with each other to decide whom to send through to the final. Pinnock was given the casting vote and eventually chose to send Since September through to the final.

"Final" (7 November 2020) 
Special Performances:
 Little Mix – "Secret Love Song"
 Zara Larsson – "WOW"

Results summary
Colour key
 Indicates that the group had the highest score and won the episode
 Indicates that the group was in the bottom two and had to perform again in the sing-off
 Indicates that the group was eliminated from the competition
 Indicates that the group won Little Mix The Search
 Indicates that the group was a runner-up

Awards and nominations

References

External links
 
 

2020 British television series debuts
2020 British television series endings
2020s British reality television series
2020s British music television series
BBC reality television shows
English-language television shows
Little Mix
Singing talent shows
Television productions suspended due to the COVID-19 pandemic